Melissa Anne Barbieri (born 20 February 1980) is an Australian international football goalkeeper who plays for Melbourne City in the A-League Women. She earned over 86 caps with the Australia women's national soccer team and competed at four FIFA Women's World Cup tournaments. Barbieri retired from international football in 2015.

Barbieri was named W-League Goalkeeper of the Year for the 2008–09 and 2013–14 seasons.

Early life and education
Barbieri was a scholarship holder with the Victorian Institute of Sport.

Playing career
In her early career Barbieri was a midfielder until she was 20 years old, when a hamstring tendinitis injury required her to stop playing in the outfield. In September 2002 she made her debut for Australia in a game against Canada.

Before the 2007 World Cup Barbieri played 54 games for Australia. She played for Richmond SC, becoming the first female to play in the Australian semi-professional men's league. After gaining experience in the men's league, Barbieri made her debut in goals for the Matildas in September 2002 in a 1–0 win against Canada.

In 2008, she was approached by the US football team, the Boston Renegades. However, the Boston management eventually pursued this no further for the remainder of the season, due to Barbieri's commitments to the Australian national team.

She signed for Melbourne Victory for the inaugural season of the Westfield W-League. Barbieri won the Goalkeeper of the year award in that season.

On 19 February 2010, Barbieri was named captain of the Matildas following the 2009 retirement of Cheryl Salisbury.

In May 2015, national coach Alen Stajcic surprisingly axed Brianna Davey from Australia's 2015 FIFA Women's World Cup squad, a decision criticised in many quarters, recalling resurgent veteran Barbieri for her fourth World Cup.

In July 2016, Barbieri signed a deal to play one game as a guest for Taroona in the Tasmanian Women's Super League.

In November 2017, Barbieri came out of retirement to join Melbourne City on an injury replacement contract, after one of their goalkeepers Emily Shields broke her wrist.

Coaching career
Barbieri was appointed coach of Heidelberg United's women's team in October 2016.

In July 2018, Barbieri was appointed as an assistant coach of the Melbourne City W-League team.

In popular culture
Barbieri was on the cover of the Australian FourFourTwo Magazine along with fellow Matilda's Thea Slatyer, Sam Kerr, Kyah Simon and Sarah Walsh in June 2011.

Personal life
Barbieri gave birth to her first child, a girl, in 2013.

Career highlights
2013–14 W-League keeper of the year award
2010 Qualified for FIFA Women's World Cup
2010 Captain the Matildas at the AFC Women's Asian Cup which they beat North Korea in penalties to win the competition
2007 Qualified for FIFA Women's World Cup
2006 2nd at the AFC Women's Asian Cup
2005 Four Nations Tour
2004 1st at the Oceania Football Confederation Women's Olympic Qualifying Tournament
2004 2nd at the 6th Australia Cup (Brisbane)
2004 Competed at the 2004 Summer Olympics in Athens
2003 13th at the 2003 FIFA Women's World Cup
2003 Pre-World Cup Tour (China, Great Britain, Canada)
2003 2nd at the 3-Nations International Tournament in Japan
2003 2nd at the Australia Cup
2003 Gained Australian Institute of Sport Scholarship
2002 Canada Series
2002 2nd at the US Nike Cup (international debut vs. Canada with a clean sheet)
2001 First national camp as a goal keeper
2000 Switched to goal keeper position
1997 Selected for a national camp as a midfielder

Honours

Country
Australia
 OFC Women's Nations Cup: 2003
 AFC Women's Asian Cup: 2010
 AFF Women's Championship: 2008

Individual
 W-League Goalkeeper of the Year: 2008–09, 2013–14

References

External links

 
 Football Federation Australia player profile
 Melbourne Victory player profile
 Victorian Institute of Sport profile

Australian women's soccer players
1980 births
Living people
Melbourne Victory FC (A-League Women) players
Newcastle Jets FC (A-League Women) players
Adelaide United FC (A-League Women) players
Melbourne City FC (A-League Women) players
Australian people of Italian descent
Olympic soccer players of Australia
Footballers at the 2004 Summer Olympics
2003 FIFA Women's World Cup players
2007 FIFA Women's World Cup players
2011 FIFA Women's World Cup players
2015 FIFA Women's World Cup players
Soccer players from Melbourne
Australia women's international soccer players
Women's association football goalkeepers
Victorian Institute of Sport alumni
Australian soccer coaches